Coggeshall is a small market town in Essex, England.

Coggeshall may also refer to:

People
Calvert Coggeshall, abstract painter and designer
Harris Coggeshall, American tennis player
 Henry Coggeshall, inventor of the Coggeshall slide rule
Henry J. Coggeshall (1845–1914), American politician and lawyer
John Coggeshall (1601–1647), a founder of Rhode Island
John Coggeshall, Jr. (1624–1708), colonial deputy governor of Rhode Island, son of John Coggeshall
Mary Jane Coggeshall (1837–1911), American suffragist
Sir William Coggeshall (1358–1426), English Member of Parliament
William Turner Coggeshall (1824–1867), American diplomat
Mary C. Seward (Mary Holden Coggeshall Seward 1839-1919), American poet, composer, and civic activist

Places
Coggeshall Hamlet, a small town in England

See also
Ralph of Coggeshall, English chronicler